Auger may refer to:

Engineering
 Auger bit, a drill bit
 Auger conveyor, a device for moving material by means of a rotating helical flighting
 Auger (platform), the world's first tension leg oil rig; see Big, Bigger, Biggest
 Earth auger, a drilling tool or machine used for making holes in the ground
 Wood auger, a drill for making holes in wood (or in the ground)

Science and technology
 Auger effect, an electron effect in physics
 Auger electron spectroscopy, an analytical technique using the Auger effect
 Auger shell or auger snail, a common name for shellfish of the family Terebridae
 Auger therapy, an experimental radiation therapy for the treatment of cancer

Other uses
 Auger (surname)
 Auger Hill, a hill in Antarctica

See also
 Pierre Auger Observatory, an international cosmic ray observatory
 Augur (disambiguation)
 Agar (disambiguation)